Across the Rio Grande may refer to:

 Across the Rio Grande (album), a 1988 album by Holly Dunn
 Across the Rio Grande (film), a 1949 American western film